Panthera gombaszoegensis, also known as the European jaguar,  is a Panthera species that lived from about 2.0 to 0.35 million years ago in Europe. The first fossils were excavated in 1938 in Gombasek, Slovakia.

More of its fossil remains were excavated from the Olivola site in Italy, while finds elsewhere in Italy were initially named Panthera toscana. Later fossils were found in England, Germany, Spain, France, and the Netherlands. Sometimes it is recognized as a subspecies of Panthera onca, the jaguar, as Panthera onca gombaszoegensis.

Description
European jaguars were larger than modern-day jaguars found in South America, such as Pantanal and Peruvian jaguars. With a bodyweight between 70 and 210 kg (154 to 463 lbs), they were therefore probably capable of bringing down larger prey. Like other Panthera species, they are thought to have been sexually dimorphic, with significantly larger males.

History
The ancestors of jaguars are thought to have arisen in Africa; a related form of Panthera was present in South Africa 1.9 Ma ago. Another form similar to P. gombaszoegensis has been found dating from early Pleistocene East Africa and had both lion- and tiger-like characteristics. P. gombaszoegensis was initially the only European Pantherinae species in the Early Pleistocene, being present alongside the felines Acinonyx pardinensis and Puma pardoides and the machairodontines Homotherium latidens and Megantereon whitei. Leopards arrived later in the Early Pleistocene or the Middle Pleistocene, and lions in the Middle Pleistocene.

Taxonomy
Leo gombaszoegensis was the scientific name proposed by Miklós Kretzoi in 1938 for teeth found in Tertiary deposits in Gombasek Cave, Slovakia. It was reassessed and subordinated to the genus Panthera in 1971. The following are considered to belong to P. gombaszoegensis as well:

Panthera toscana proposed in 1949 for carnassial teeth found in Villafranchian deposits in the Arno river valley in Italy. These remains were originally described as a distinct species and later as  subspecies Panthera gombaszoegensis toscana. It is sometimes referred to as the Tuscany jaguar or Tuscany lion.
Felis (Panthera) schreuderi proposed in 1960 for cat fossils found in Tegelen, the Netherlands.
Jansofelis vaufreyi proposed in 1971 for cat fossils found in southeastern France.

Some remains once attributed to P. gombaszoegensis have more recently been identified as Acinonyx pardinensis.

A 2022 study based on a relatively complete skull from Belgium suggested that P. gombaszoegensis is more closely related to the tiger (Panthera tigris), than the jaguar.

Habitat and behavior
The European jaguar has often been thought to be a forest-dwelling cat, similar in habits to the modern jaguar, although recent work suggests that the association between the European jaguar and forested habitats is not as strong as has often been assumed. It was probably a solitary animal.

See also
Panthera atrox
Panthera blytheae
Panthera palaeosinensis
Panthera shawi
Panthera spelaea
Panthera zdanskyi

References

Panthera
Pleistocene carnivorans
Pleistocene mammals of Europe
Pleistocene mammals of Africa
Middle Pleistocene
Prehistoric pantherines
Prehistoric mammals of Europe
Prehistoric mammals of Africa
Fossil taxa described in 1938
Pleistocene first appearances
Pleistocene extinctions